The 2022 World Surf League is the 45th season of all iterations of the tour circuit for professional surfers. Billabong Pipe Masters will be the first round of the tour.

For the second time, the season will end at Lower Trestles, in San Clemente, USA, with the top five seeded men and women from the season going head to head to determine the champion at the WSL Finals.

Gabriel Medina and Carissa Moore are the defending champions.

Schedule 
The championship series will consist of the following events, subject to change due to the COVID-19 pandemic.

Results and Standings

Event Results

Men's Standings 
Points are awarded using the following structure:

Women's Standings 
Points are awarded using the following structure:

References

External links

 
World Surf League
World Surf League